Carl Georg Björling was a Swedish lawyer and professor.

Life 

He was born on 16 September 1870 in Halmstad, Sweden, and was the son of Carl Fabian Björling and his wife Minna Agnes Cecilia von Schéele. He died on 14 March 1934.

Career 

He attained his Juris Doctor degree from Lund University. He worked as a clerk at the Svea Court of Appeal. He later became a professor and vice-rector at Lund University.

Honours 

In 1920, he became a commander of the Dannebrog order.

Bibliography 
 Textbook of Civil Law for Beginners

References

External links 
 

20th-century Swedish lawyers
People from Halmstad
Lund University alumni
Academic staff of Lund University
Commanders of the Order of the Dannebrog
1870 births
1934 deaths